Juan Moreno Fernández (born 11 May 1997) is a Spanish professional footballer who plays for CD Palencia Cristo Atlético as a right winger.

Club career
Born in Móstoles, Madrid, Moreno joined Atlético Madrid's youth setup in 2007, aged ten. In July 2016 he was promoted to the reserves in Tercera División, making his senior debut on 4 September by coming on as a late substitute in a 2–0 home win against CF Trival Valderas.

On 18 September 2016 Moreno scored his first senior goal, netting the game's only in a home success over Rayo Vallecano B. He made his first team debut on 30 November, replacing fellow debutant Caio Henrique in a 6–0 away routing of CD Guijuelo, for the season's Copa del Rey.

On 21 January 2019, Moreno joined CDA Navalcarnero, but had his contract terminated on 2 April, after only played 20 minutes played. On 25 July, he moved to another reserve team, Betis Deportivo Balompié in the fourth division.

On 22 October 2020, Moreno signed for Arandina CF also in division four, but left the club on 6 November. He subsequently represented CF Fuenlabrada's B-team before joining Segunda División RFEF side CD Palencia Cristo Atlético.

References

External links

1997 births
Living people
People from Móstoles
Spanish footballers
Footballers from the Community of Madrid
Association football wingers
Segunda División B players
Tercera División players
Divisiones Regionales de Fútbol players
Atlético Madrid B players
Atlético Madrid footballers
FC Cartagena footballers
CDA Navalcarnero players
Betis Deportivo Balompié footballers
Arandina CF players
CF Fuenlabrada B players